The 2016–17 Chicago Blackhawks season was the 91st season for the National Hockey League, a franchise that was established on September 25 th, 1926. The Blackhawks finished the season with 109 points to win the Central Division and the best record in the Western Conference. As a result, they received the No. 1 seed in the West of the Stanley Cup Playoffs, but were swept in the first round by the eventual Stanley Cup runner-up Nashville Predators.

Following the playoff loss, general manager Stan Bowman stated that the playoff loss was unacceptable and vowed that changes would be made.

Patrick Kane led the Blackhawks in scoring with 89 points and 34 goals. The Blackhawks had six players score 20 or more goals, Kane, Artemi Panarin (31), Marian Hossa (26), Artem Anisimov (22), Richard Panik (22), and Jonathan Toews (21). Goaltender Corey Crawford led the Blackhawks with 32 wins.

Standings

Schedule and results

Pre-season

Regular season

Detailed records

Playoffs

Player statistics
Final stats

Skaters

Goaltenders

†Denotes player spent time with another team before joining Blackhawks. Stats reflect time with Blackhawks only.
‡Left team mid-season. Stats reflect time with Blackhawks only.

Awards and honours

Awards

Milestones

Records

Transactions
The Blackhawks have been involved in the following transactions during the 2016–17 season.

Trades

Notes

Free agents acquired

Free agents lost

Claimed via waivers

Lost via waivers

Lost via retirement

Player signings

Detailed transaction list 
Source

Off-season 
 April 29, 2016 – Agreed to terms with F Luke Johnson on a three-year contract.
 May 11, 2016 – Agreed to terms with D Gustav Forsling on a three-year contract.
 May 24, 2016 – Agreed to terms with G Lars Johansson, D Michal Kempny and F Martin Lundberg on one-year contracts.
 June 15, 2016 – Agreed to terms with G Mac Carruth on a one-year contract.
 June 15, 2016 – Agreed to terms with F Richard Panik on a one-year contract.
 June 19, 2016 – Agreed to terms with F Nick Schmaltz on a three-year contract.
 June 23, 2016 – Agreed to terms with F Dennis Rasmussen on a one-year contract.
 June 30, 2016 – Agreed to terms with F Brandon Mashinter and D Michal Rozsival on one-year contracts
 July 1, 2016 – Agreed to terms with D Brian Campbell and Fs Sam Carrick, Spencer Abbott and Pierre-Cedric Labrie on one-year contracts. Named Will Chukerman media relations assistant.
 July 6, 2016 – Agreed to terms with F Jordin Tootoo on a one-year contract.
 July 7, 2016 – Named Derek King assistant coach for Rockford (AHL).
 July 15, 2016 – Agreed to terms with F Mark McNeill on a one-year contract.
 September 26, 2016 – Agreed to terms with F Alexandre Fortin on a three-year contract.
 September 26, 2016 – Released Fs Tyler Barnes, Bryn Chyzyk, Jeremy Langlois, Trevor Mingoia, Evan Mosey; D Jonathan Carlsson, Nick Mattson and G Eric Levine from their tryout agreements. Released F Radovan Bondra, John Dahlstrom, Nathan Noel and Roy Radke from training camp and returned them to their junior hockey teams.
 September 30, 2016 – Agreed to terms with F Graham Knott on a three-year contract.

October 
 October 1, 2016 – Assigned F Kyle Baun, D Dillon Fournier, D Carl Dahlstrom and D Nolan Valleau to Rockford (AHL). Released F Alex DeBrincat and F Graham Knott from training camp.
 October 2, 2016 – Assigned G Mac Carruth to Rockford (AHL).
 October 3, 2016 – Assigned Fs Luke Johnson, Tanner Kero and Martin Lundberg; D Erik Gustafsson, Robin Norell and Ville Pokka, and G Lars Johansson to Rockford (AHL). Released Fs Chris DeSousa and Jake Dowell from their tryout agreements.
 October 4, 2016 – Assigned Fs Spencer Abbott, Sam Carrick and Pierre-Cedric Labrie and D Viktor Svedberg and Cameron Schilling to Rockford (AHL).
 October 7, 2016 – Recalled D Viktor Svedberg and D Ville Pokka from Rockford (AHL).
 October 9, 2016 – Assigned D Dillon Fournier, Ville Pokka and Viktor Svedberg to Rockford (AHL).
 October 10, 2016 – Assigned F Alexandre Fortin to Rouyn-Noranda (QMJHL) and G Ivan Nalimov to Vladivostok (KHL). Placed F Andrew Desjardins on injured reserve.
 October 11, 2016 – Assigned Fs Brandon Mashinter and Mark McNeill to Rockford (AHL).

November 
 November 6, 2016 – Placed F Trevor van Riemsdyk on injured reserve. Activated F Andrew Desjardins from injured reserve.
 November 7, 2016 – Agreed to terms with F DeBrincat on a three-year contract.

December 
 December 2, 2016 – Placed F Jonathan Toews on injured reserve, retroactive to Nov. 24. Activated Trevor van Riemsdyk from injured reserve.
 December 4, 2016 – Recalled G Lars Johansson from Rockford (AHL). Assigned F Nick Schmaltz to Rockford.
 December 6, 2016 – Placed G Corey Crawford on injured reserve, retroactive to Saturday.
 December 13, 2016 – Activated F Jonathan Toews from injured reserve.
 December 22, 2016 – Placed F Artem Anisimov on injured reserve, retroactive to Dec. 18. Recalled F Tanner Kero from Rockford (AHL).
 December 27, 2016 – Activated F Artem Anisimov from injured reserve. Placed F Marian Hossa on injured reserve, retroactive to Dec. 20.
 December 28, 2016 – Agreed to terms with F Artemi Panarin on a two-year contract extension.

January 
 January 1, 2017 – Placed F Marcus Kruger on injured reserve, retroactive to Dec. 30.
 January 4, 2017 – Assigned F Tyler Motte to Rockford (AHL). Recalled F Spencer Abbott from Rockford (AHL).
 January 5, 2017 – Activated F Marian Hossa from injured reserve.
 January 6, 2017 – Assigned D Gustav Forsling and F Spencer Abbott to Rockford (AHL).
 January 14, 2017 – Recalled F Nick Schmaltz from Rockford (AHL).
 January 21, 2017 – Acquired F Michael Latta from the Los Angeles Kings for D Cameron Schilling.
 January 24, 2017 – Activated F Marcus Kruger from injured reserve.
 January 29, 2017 – Placed D Michal Rozsival on injured reserve, retroactive to Jan. 25. Recalled D Gustav Forsling from Rockford (AHL).

February 
 February 12, 2017 – Reassigned D Gustav Forsling and Fs Vinnie Hinostroza, Tanner Kero, and Nick Schmaltz to Rockford (AHL). Activated D Michal Roszival from injured reserve.
 February 16, 2017 – Recalled Fs Tanner Kero, and Nick Schmaltz from Rockford (AHL).
 February 19, 2017 – Recalled F Vinnie Hinostroza from Rockford (AHL).
 February 23, 2017 – Agreed to terms with G Jeff Glass on a two-year contract through the 2017–18 season.
 February 24, 2017 – Acquired F Tomas Jurco from Detroit Red Wings for a 2017 third-round draft pick. Reassigned F Vinnie Hinostroza to Rockford (AHL).
 February 25, 2017 – Assigned G Jeff Glass to Rockford (AHL)
 February 26, 2017 – Recalled G Lars Johansson from Rockford (AHL)
 February 27, 2017 – Assigned G Lars Johansson to Rockford (AHL)

Draft picks

Below are the Chicago Blackhawks' selections at the 2016 NHL Entry Draft, to be held on June 24–25, 2016 at the First Niagara Center in Buffalo.

Notes

 The Chicago Blackhawks' first-round pick went to the Philadelphia Flyers as the result of a trade on June 24, 2016, that sent a first and third-round pick both in 2016 (18th and 79th overall) to Winnipeg in exchange for a second-round pick in 2016 (36th overall) and this pick.
Winnipeg previously acquired this pick from Chicago as the result of a trade on February 25, 2016, that sent Andrew Ladd, Jay Harrison and Matt Fraser to Chicago in exchange for Marko Dano, a conditional third-round pick in 2018 and this pick.

 The Montreal Canadiens' second-round pick went to the Chicago Blackhawks as the result of a trade on June 24, 2016, that sent Andrew Shaw to Montreal in exchange for Minnesota's second-round pick in 2016 (45th overall) and this pick.
 The Minnesota Wild's second-round pick went to the Chicago Blackhawks as the result of a trade on June 24, 2016, that sent Andrew Shaw to Montreal in exchange for a second-round pick in 2016 (39th overall) and this pick.
Montreal previously acquired this pick as the result of a trade on July 1, 2014, that sent Josh Gorges to Buffalo in exchange for this pick.
Buffalo previously acquired this pick as the result of a trade on March 5, 2014, that sent Matt Moulson and Cody McCormick to Minnesota in exchange for Torrey Mitchell, Winnipeg's second-round pick in 2014 and this pick.

 The New York Rangers' second-round pick went to the Chicago Blackhawks as the result of a trade on June 15, 2016, that sent Teuvo Teravainen and Bryan Bickell to Carolina in exchange for Chicago's third-round pick in 2017 and this pick.
Carolina previously acquired this pick as the result of a trade on February 28, 2016, that sent Eric Staal to New York in exchange for Aleksi Saarela, a second-round pick in 2017 and this pick.

 The Chicago Blackhawks' second-round pick went to the Philadelphia Flyers as the result of a trade on February 27, 2015, that sent Kimmo Timonen to Chicago in exchange for a second-round pick in 2015 and this pick (being conditional at the time of the trade). The condition – Philadelphia will receive a second-round pick in 2016 if Chicago advances to the 2015 Stanley Cup Finals with Timonen playing in at least 50% of the Blackhawks' playoff games – was converted on May 30, 2015.
 The New York Islanders' fourth-round pick went to Chicago Blackhawks as the result of a trade on June 25, 2016, that sent Columbus' fourth-round pick in 2016 (95th overall) to New York in exchange for a sixth-round pick in 2017 and this pick.

References

Chicago Blackhawks seasons
Chicago Blackhawks
2016 in sports in Illinois
2017 in sports in Illinois